Maja e Malësores is an impressive mountain in the country of Albania. At  elevation, it is located in the central main part of the Accursed Mountains range, 1.5 km northwest of Maja Jezercë. Like Maja e Popljuces, it is also surrounded by many high peaks which are all located in Albania. Deep river canyons and beautiful valleys surround the mountain.

References

External links
archived page from Summitpost, Maja Malisores

Mountains of Albania
Accursed Mountains